Ostasio I da Polenta (died November 14, 1346) was lord of Ravenna from 1322 until his death.

He was the son of Bernardino da Polenta, lord of Cervia. On September 20, 1322 he profited from the absence of Guido Novello da Polenta to seize power in Ravenna, killing the archbishop Rinaldo da Polenta. Four years later Ostasio had his uncle Bannino da Polenta, who held power in Cervia, killed, assuming thenceforth the lordship of that city also.

Ostasio was also a patron of the arts, and housed Giovanni Boccaccio in his court (1345–1346).

Pope Benedict XII legitimised his power with the title Papal vicar, but soon afterwards Ostasio died, allegedly assassinated by his son Bernardino.

See also
Da Polenta

|-

1346 deaths
Ostasio 1
Assassinated Italian people
Italian assassins
Assassins of heads of state
14th-century Italian nobility
Year of birth unknown
Medieval assassins
14th-century murderers